Santiago Ramsés Carrasco Ruiz (born July 5, 1993, in Colima City, Colima) is a Mexican professional footballer who currently plays for Loros de la Universidad de Colima.

References

External links
 

1993 births
Living people
Loros UdeC footballers
Ascenso MX players
Liga Premier de México players
Association football defenders
Footballers from Colima
Mexican footballers
People from Colima City